Alfred Fields (born 1846) was a state legislator in Mississippi. He represented Panola County, Mississippi in the Mississippi House of Representatives in 1880.

He was born 1846 in Bourbon County, Kentucky.

James M. Young was accused of shooting him in 1884. He was sentenced to two years in the penitentiary for bribery in 1885.

See also
 African-American officeholders during and following the Reconstruction era

References

Members of the Mississippi House of Representatives
1846 births
Year of death missing
American politicians convicted of bribery
African-American state legislators in Mississippi
People from Bourbon County, Kentucky
People from Panola County, Mississippi
19th-century African-American politicians
19th-century American politicians